The 2017 Tour of Britain was an eight-stage men's professional road cycling race. It was the fourteenth running of the modern version of the Tour of Britain and the 77th British tour in total. The race started on 3 September in Edinburgh and finished on 10 September in Cardiff. The race was part of the 2017 UCI Europe Tour.

Teams

The twenty teams invited to participate in the Tour of Britain were:

Stages

Stage 1
3 September 2017 — Edinburgh to Kelso,

Stage 2
4 September 2017 — Kielder Water to Blyth,

Stage 3
5 September 2017 — Normanby Hall – Scunthorpe,

Stage 4
6 September 2017 — Mansfield – Newark-on-Trent,

Stage 5
7 September 2017 — Tendring,

Stage 6
8 September 2017 — Newmarket to Aldeburgh,

Stage 7
9 September 2017 — Hemel Hempstead to Cheltenham,

Stage 8
10 September 2017 — Worcester to Cardiff,

Classification leadership

References

External links

2017
Tour of Britain
Tour of Britain
Tour of Britain